Tomasz Lenart  (born 11 April 1969 in Łódź) is a retired Polish professional footballer who played for ŁKS Łódź and Stomil Olsztyn in the Polish Ekstraklasa. Lenart made two appearances for the Poland national football team.

References

External links
 

1969 births
Living people
Footballers from Łódź
Polish footballers
Poland international footballers
ŁKS Łódź players
OKS Stomil Olsztyn players
Association football defenders